Mark Bayliss (born 12 December 1965) is a former Australian rules footballer in the Australian Football League.

Bayliss was recruited from the WAFL club South Fremantle by Collingwood with their first-round draft pick in the 1988 National Draft. He played as the second string key forward behind Coleman Medallist Brian Taylor and only played in four games.

References

External links

1965 births
Collingwood Football Club players
South Fremantle Football Club players
Living people
VFL/AFL players born in England
Australian rules footballers from Western Australia